Severo Hernández (6 November 1940 – 15 April 2022) was a Colombian cyclist. He competed in the team pursuit at the 1968 Summer Olympics.

References

External links
 

1940 births
2022 deaths
Colombian male cyclists
Olympic cyclists of Colombia
Cyclists at the 1968 Summer Olympics
Sportspeople from Santander Department
20th-century Colombian people
21st-century Colombian people